La descarriada (translation: The Wayward Ones) is a 1973 Spanish comedy film directed by Mariano Ozores and starring Antonio Ozores, Florinda Chico, Lina Morgan and Rafaela Aparicio.

Cast

References

External links
 

Spanish sex comedy films
1970s sex comedy films
Films directed by Mariano Ozores
Films shot in Madrid
Films about prostitution in Spain
1973 comedy films
1973 films